Amela Lukač Zoranić (born 15 August 1979), also known simply as Amela Zoranić, is a Serbian Bosniak academic and politician. A longtime member of Chief Mufti Muamer Zukorlić's political movement, she served in the National Assembly of Serbia from 2021 to 2022 as a member of the Justice and Reconciliation Party (Stranka pravde i pomirenja, SPP).

Early life and academic career
Lukač Zoranić was born in Novi Pazar, in the Sandžak region of what was then the Socialist Republic of Serbia in the Socialist Federal Republic of Yugoslavia. She graduated from the University of Priština in 2002 with a degree in English language and literature and later received a master's degree and a Ph.D. from the International University in Novi Pazar. She has worked at the International University since 2004 as a professor of English language and literature, was appointed as vice-rector in 2009, and served as dean of the Arts Department from 2019 to 2021.

Her academic work is focused on fields such as Anglo-American literature and culture, critical theory, colonial and postcolonial studies, and cultural studies. She published the English-language poetry collection Lullaby in 2019. Lukač Zoranić has said that her favourite author is William Faulkner and her favourite musician is Leonard Cohen.

Politician

Bosniak Democratic Union (2010–2012)
Lukać Zoranić was appointed as secretary-general of Muamer Zukorlic's Bosniak Cultural Community group in January 2010.

Serbia introduced the first direct elections for the country's national minority councils in 2010. The Bosniak Cultural Community contested the elections and won seventeen mandates, as opposed to thirteen for the Bosniak List led by Sulejman Ugljanin and five for the Bosniak Renaissance group of Rasim Ljajić. Lukač Zoranić was among the candidates elected on Zukorlić's list. The results were extremely contentious, and the legitimacy of the Bosniak Cultural Community's victory was contested by both the Serbian government and Ugljanin's party. The council's responsibilities were officially suspended soon after the election, although Zukorlić's group continued to oversee what it described as council meetings in defiance of the government's decision. Lukač Zoranić was appointed as chair of the breakaway council's committee on international co-operation.

She was also a founding member of the Zukorlić-affiliated Bosniak Democratic Union (Bošnjačka demokratska zajednica, BDZ) in late 2010. The party contested the 2012 Serbian parliamentary election as part of the All Together (Sve Zajedno) coalition, and she received the sixth position on its electoral list. The list won a single seat, which was automatically assigned to the top-ranked candidate, BDZ leader Emir Elfić. Lukač also received the third position on the BDZ's list for the Novi Pazar city assembly in the concurrent 2012 Serbian local elections and was elected when the list won ten mandates.

Bosniak Democratic Union of Sandžak (2013–17)
The BDZ became divided between supporters of Elfić and supporters of Zukorlić in 2013. Lukač Zoranić sided with Zukorlić and, when the party formally split at the end of the year, joined the breakaway Bosniak Democratic Union of Sandžak (Bošnjačka demokratska zajednica Sandžaka, BDZS). This party contested the 2014 parliamentary election on the electoral list of the Liberal Democratic Party (Liberalno demokratska partija, LDP), and Lukač Zoranić received the eighteenth position on the list. Election from this position was plausible, but the list did not cross the electoral threshold for assembly representation. During the campaign, Lukač Zoranić acknowledged that the LDP and BDZS held differing views on LGBTQ issues, saying that the LDP stood for "the rights of the LBGT population" while the BDZS stood for what she described as " the affirmation of [heterosexual] marriage and family." In stating this, she also remarked that it was not required for the parties to agree on all things.

A new election was held for the Bosniak National Council in 2014, and Lukač Zoranić received the third position on Zukorlić's For Bosniaks, Sandžak and the Mufti list. The only other list to appear on the ballot was Ugljanin's For Bosniak Unity. Ugljanin's list won the election, nineteen seats to sixteen. Zukorlić's group initially raised concerns about electoral fraud but ultimately accepted the results, and Lukač Zoranić served as a member of the opposition.

The BDZS fielded its own list in the 2016 parliamentary election. Lukač Zoranić appeared in the sixth position on the list and was not elected when it won two mandates. She also received the sixth position on the party's list in Novi Pazar for the 2016 local elections and was re-elected when the list again won ten mandates.

Justice and Reconciliation Party (2017–present)
The BDZS was restructured as the Justice and Reconciliation Party in 2017, with Muamer Zukorlić as the party leader.

Lukač Zoranić received the third position on the Mufti's list for the 2018 Bosniak National Council election and was re-elected when the list won thirteen seats. As in 2014, Zukorlić's list was narrowly defeated by Ugljanin's. Following the election, Ugljanin's group formed a coalition with a third list aligned with Ljajić, and the Zukorlić faction remained in opposition.

She was given the fifth position on the SPP's list in the 2020 parliamentary election and narrowly missed election when the list won four mandates. She also appeared in the fifth position on the party's list for Novi Pazar in the 2020 local elections and was elected to a third term when the list won eleven seats.

Muamer Zukorlić died on 6 November 2021, and, as the next candidate on the list, Lukač Zoranić was given a mandate in the Serbian national assembly as his replacement on 25 November. During the 2020–22 parliament, the SPP provided outside support to Serbia's government led by the Serbian Progressive Party (Srpska napredna stranka, SNS), and Lukač Zoranić served as a supporter of the administration.

Muamer Zukorlić's son Usame Zukorlić became SPP leader after his father's death. Lukać Zoranić did not have a good relationship with the new party leadership and was not a candidate in the 2022 parliamentary election. She resigned from all positions in the party in May 2022.

References

1979 births
Living people
Bosniaks of Serbia
Politicians from Novi Pazar
Members of the National Assembly (Serbia)
Members of the Bosniac National Council (Serbia)
Bosniak Democratic Union politicians
Bosniak Democratic Union of Sandžak politicians
Justice and Reconciliation Party politicians
Women members of the National Assembly (Serbia)